The Johnstown Flood is a 1926 American silent epic drama film directed by Irving Cummings, that addresses the Great Flood of 1889 in Johnstown, Pennsylvania. The film stars George O'Brien, Florence Gilbert, and Janet Gaynor.

Plot

Tom O'Day becomes engaged to Gloria Hamilton even though Anna has love for Tom, unbeknownst to him. Gloria's father, John Hamilton, owns a lumber camp outside of Johnstown, Pennsylvania and has control of the dam upriver. To satisfy obligatory contracts he has to make sure he clears as much trees as possible. To do this, John has made sure the water level behind the dam is at maximum capacity but Tom knows there is a fault in the dam. Tom has to do everything he can to convince John to open the flood gates before disaster strikes Johnstown in the valley below.

Cast

Preservation
The Johnstown Flood is a surviving film with a print held in the George Eastman Museum Motion Picture Collection.

References

External links

Lantern slide The Johnstown Flood

1926 films
American silent feature films
American epic films
American black-and-white films
Fox Film films
Films directed by Irving Cummings
1926 drama films
Silent American drama films
Films with screenplays by Robert Lord (screenwriter)
1920s American films
Silent adventure films